Ochroepalpus is a genus of parasitic flies in the family Tachinidae. There are at least two described species in Ochroepalpus.

Species
These two species belong to the genus Ochroepalpus:
 Ochroepalpus citrinus Blanchard, 1941
 Ochroepalpus ochraceus Townsend, 1927

References

Further reading

 
 
 
 

Tachinidae
Articles created by Qbugbot